The 2004 Preakness Stakes was the 129th running of the Preakness Stakes thoroughbred horse race. The race took place on May 15, 2004, and was televised in the United States on the NBC television network. Smarty Jones, who was jockeyed by Stewart Elliott, won the race by eleven and one half lengths over runner-up Rock Hard Ten. Approximate post time was 6:25 p.m. Eastern Time. The race was run over a fast track in a final time of 1:55.59. The Maryland Jockey Club reported total attendance of 124,351, this is recorded as second highest on the list of American thoroughbred racing top attended events for North America in 2004.

Payout 

The 129th Preakness Stakes Payout Schedule

 $2 Exacta: (7–10) paid $24.60
 $2 Trifecta: (7–10–9) paid $177.20
 $1 Superfecta: (7–10–9–1) paid $230.70

The full chart 

 Winning Breeder: Someday Farm; (PA)  
 Final Time:  1:55.59
 Track Condition:  Fast
 Total Attendance: 124,351

See also 

 2004 Kentucky Derby
 2004 Belmont Stakes

References

External links 

 

2004
2004 in horse racing
2004 in American sports
2004 in sports in Maryland
Horse races in Maryland